Ryan Matthew Haynes (born 27 September 1995) is an English professional footballer who plays as a left back for League Two Northampton Town.

Career

Coventry City
Raised in Daventry, Northamptonshire, Haynes was spotted by Coventry City at a youth tournament in Rugby, Warwickshire. With senior left-backs at the club unavailable through injury and suspension, Haynes made his professional debut on 6 April 2013 in a 1–1 League One playing the whole game of a draw with Brentford. He scored his first goal for Coventry in a 3–2 win over Peterborough United on 25 October 2014.

He scored his second goal for Coventry in a 3-2 EFL Cup win against Portsmouth on 9 August 2016. He scored a brace in an EFL Trophy tie against Wycombe Wanderers on 9 November 2016.

Cambridge United (loan)
On 13 February 2016, Haynes joined Cambridge United on loan for the remainder of the 2015–16 season.

Shrewsbury Town
Haynes joined League One side Shrewsbury Town on a two-year contract for an undisclosed fee in June 2018.

Newport County
On 12 July 2019, Haynes joined League Two side Newport County on a two-year contract for an undisclosed fee. On 3 August 2019 he made his debut for Newport in a 2–2 draw against Mansfield Town On 31 August 2019, he scored his first goal for Newport in a 2–0 win against Forest Green Rovers in League Two. Haynes played for Newport in the League Two playoff final at Wembley Stadium on 31 May 2021 which Newport lost to Morecambe, 1-0 after a 107th minute penalty. In June 2021 Haynes signed a one year contract extension with Newport County. He was released by Newport County at the end of the 2021–22 season.

Northampton Town
On 20 June 2022, Haynes agreed to join fellow League Two club Northampton Town on a two-year contract from 1 July when his Newport County contract would expire.

Career statistics

References

External links

1995 births
Living people
English footballers
Footballers from Northampton
Association football midfielders
Coventry City F.C. players
Cambridge United F.C. players
Shrewsbury Town F.C. players
Newport County A.F.C. players
Northampton Town F.C. players
English Football League players